The Associated Air Liberty 181 is an American homebuilt aircraft that was designed and produced by Associated Air of Woodland, Washington, introduced in the late 1990s. When it was available the aircraft was supplied as a kit for amateur construction.

Design and development
The Liberty 181 was designed as a bushplane for hauling heavy loads into unprepared airstrips. It features a strut-braced high-wing, a four-seat enclosed cabin with doors, fixed conventional landing gear and a single engine in tractor configuration.

The aircraft is made from mixed metal and composites and features extra large doors for loading bulky items.

Factory supplied options included floats and skis. The manufacturer estimates the construction time from the supplied kit as 2000 hours.

Operational history
By 1998 the company reported that 7 kits had been sold, with one aircraft flying.

In October 2016 no examples were registered in the United States with the Federal Aviation Administration, although one had been previously registered and exported to Canada. In October 2016 one was registered with Transport Canada, having been built in the US in 1996 and imported in 2008.

Specifications (Liberty 181)

References

External links
Photo of a Liberty 181

Liberty 181
1990s United States civil utility aircraft
Single-engined tractor aircraft
High-wing aircraft
Homebuilt aircraft